Huécar is one of the rivers that surrounds the city of Cuenca, Spain. It flows from there into the river Jucar.

See also 
 List of rivers of Spain

Rivers of Spain
Rivers of Castilla–La Mancha